Flueggea, the bushweeds, is a genus of shrubs and trees in the family Phyllanthaceae first described as a genus in 1806. It is widespread across much of Asia, Africa, and various oceanic islands, with a few species in South America and on the Iberian Peninsula.

The genus is named after John Fluegge, a German cryptogamic botanist.

Members of this genus all have entire ovate leaves and minute green flowers that form at the leaf axils in the form of fascicles or cymes. The fruits are berries, of the size of peas. With the exception of F. verrucosa, F. spirei, and occasionally F. virosa, they are dioecious.

Taxonomy
The genus Flueggea consists of 12
-16 species.

Many members of the genus were formerly classified under the genus Securinega.

Species

Formerly included
moved to other genera (Leptopus Margaritaria Meineckia Ophiopogon )

References

 
Phyllanthaceae genera
Taxa named by Carl Ludwig Willdenow
Dioecious plants